"Masta I.C." is the second single released from Mic Geronimo's debut album, The Natural.

The song was produced and co-written by Diggin' in the Crates member Buckwild, with Royal Flush contributing guest vocals and X-Ecutioners member Roc Raida providing scratches for the song. Like his previous single, "Masta I.C." was not a commercial success, instead becoming more of an underground classic. It peaked at 30 on the Billboard's Hot Rap Singles.  Ja Rule and Irv Gotti made cameo appearances in the song's music video.  The official remix was produced by Irv Gotti and featured verses from Royal Flush and the Lost Boyz, it was the last track on The Natural.

The B-Side of the single was "Time to Build", which featured guest appearances by then unknown DMX, Jay-Z and Ja Rule, each of whom would become multi-platinum superstars shortly after.

The music video was directed by Hype Williams.

Single track listing

A-Side
"Masta I.C." (Radio)- 4:20
"Masta I.C." (Radio Street)- 4:20
"Masta I.C." (Street)- 4:20
"Masta I.C." (Instrumental)- 4:20

B-Side
"Time to Build" (Radio)- 4:35
"Time to Build" (Street)- 4:35
"Time to Build" (Instrumental)- 4:35
"Masta I.C." (Acapella)- 4:20

Charts

1995 singles
Mic Geronimo songs
TVT Records singles
Music videos directed by Hype Williams